Charanjit Singh Channi  is an Indian politician who served as the 16th Chief Minister of Punjab. He is a member of the Indian National Congress. He was also Minister of Technical Education and Training in Second Amarinder Singh ministry and leader of the opposition in the Punjab Legislative Assembly. He was the first Dalit to become the CM of Punjab.

Early life and education
Channi was born in the village of Makrauna Kalan, Punjab. He studied law at Panjab University and has an MBA from PTU Jalandhar. He belongs to the Ramdasia Sikh community. He is currently pursuing PhD from Panjab University Chandigarh in topic related to Indian National Congress with Professor Emanual Nahar as his guide.

Early political career

Kharar municipal council
Channi started his political career as a municipal councillor from a ward in Kharar and was elected as the president of the Kharar municipal council in 2002.

Leader of opposition
Channi was leader of opposition in the Punjab Legislative Assembly from 2015 to 2016.

Cabinet minister
He was Minister of Technical Education and Training in Second Amarinder Singh ministry.

Chief Minister of Punjab

In September 2021, he succeeded Captain Amarinder Singh as Chief Minister of Punjab after the latter's resignation. He is the first Dalit Sikh Chief Minister of Punjab.  Commentators suggested that Punjab's large Dalit population and attempts by other parties to appeal to it may have influenced Congress's choice of Channi as Singh's successor.

On 26 September fifteen new ministers were sworn in; several ministers from the Second Amarinder Singh ministry were retained.

Soon after taking office, Channi made several policy announcements. On 21 September he promised action concerning a sacrilege case and said that the electricity bills of water works schemes would be waived and connections would be restored. On 23 September he stated "Class D" government jobs would be regularised; they were previously outsourced. In November 2021, Channi inaugurated his dream project Dastaan-e-Shahadat theme park at Chamkaur Sahib.

On 24 December 2021, Channi approved setting up Punjab State Commission for General Category. Congress leader Navjot Dahiya was appointed its first chairman. On 30 December 2021, Channi started free bus travel for students.

5 January 2022 episode
On 5 January 2022, in Firozpur district PM Narendra Modi's cavalcade was stranded for 15–20 minutes on flyover as protesting farmers blocked the Moga-Firozpur highway near Piarenana village far away while he was en route to Hussainiwala National Martyrs Memorial. Criticized by Bharatiya Janata Party, Channi denied any security lapse and stated he will recite Mahāmrityunjaya Mantra for PM's safety. In February 2022, Channi alleged that Modi has taken revenge by denying permission for his helicopter to fly from Chandigarh.

2022 Punjab Legislative Assembly election
At the end of the legislative assembly term, Channi was appointed the Chief Ministerial candidate of Congress for the 2022 Punjab Assembly elections. Navjot Singh Sidhu was the other contender expecting to be the CM candidate. The official campaign was named Sada Channi, Sada CM (Our Channi, Our CM). Official campaign song Channi Karda Masle Hal by singer Surmandeep Mansa was launched in February 2022.

He contested the 2022 Punjab Legislative Assembly election from Chamkaur Sahib and Bhadaur legislative assembly constituencies, but lost both the seats to his opponents from the Aam Aadmi Party. On 11 March 2022, Channi submitted his resignation to Governor. On 21 March 2022, he met and congratulated his successor Bhagwant Mann.

Electoral performance

Assembly elections from Chamkaur Sahib

Assembly election from Bhadaur
In 2022 Punjab Legislative Assembly election Channi was defeated by Labh Singh Ugoke.

Personal life and image
Channi is married to Kamaljit Kaur and has two children. He is known to follow astrologers for political gains, he illegally constructed a road from a park outside his official residence in Chandigarh to have east facing entry to his house. He rode an elephant in the lawns of his house in Kharar. In February 2018, Channi flipped a coin to decide the right candidate for the post of a lecturer.

See also
List of chief ministers of Punjab
Sushilkumar Shinde
Jitan Ram Manjhi

References

Living people
1963 births
Chief Ministers of Punjab, India
Chief ministers from Indian National Congress
Indian National Congress politicians
People from Punjab, India
People from Sahibzada Ajit Singh Nagar district
Punjab, India MLAs 2012–2017
Punjab, India MLAs 2017–2022
Punjabi people